You Want Some of This? is the debut album by Canadian comedy musician and Internet celebrity Jon Lajoie. It was released on January 30, 2009 and features all of his songs from his YouTube sketches up until that date with additional new tracks.

Songs
The song "Show Me Your Genitals 2: E=MC Vagina" is sampled in rapper Royce da 5'9"'s song "Vagina" from The Bar Exam 3: The Most Interesting Man. Many of the lyrics emanate humility, and although intended for comedic effect, some of the lyrics discuss intimate topics and thus may hit close to home.

Track listing

Chart positions

References

2009 debut albums
Jon Lajoie albums
2000s comedy albums